Tenstrings Music Institute is a contemporary music college in Nigeria, renowned as the country's biggest music school with study centers in Ikeja, Surulere, Festac Town, Lekki, Port Harcourt and affiliated schools in other parts of the country. Over the last nine years, Tenstrings has enrolled students from at least ten other African countries, including Ghana, Zambia, Kenya, Uganda, Cameroon, e.t.c.

Tenstrings was founded in 2007 by Akapo Emmanuel - a Nigerian music educator, after several years of teaching music in both public and private institutions. His aim was to create a vocational training center for young and talented people who dream of pursuing careers in popular music; such as Hip Hop, R & B, Gospel, Afro Music, e.t.c, whom the regular classically oriented music schools were not catering to. Some of the notable activities and events organized periodically by the institute include; The Starmingle, HippyJams, Gospel Breakfast, Playing4Change and The Ones2Watch Concert.

The school offers professional training in singing, playing musical instruments, dance, disc-jockeying, music production and sound engineering. In September 2016, it was reported that the school has trained over 7000 students in about a decade of its establishment.  In 2015, the school institutionalized career management and promotional services for its distinguished protégées.

References

Educational institutions in Nigeria
Educational institutions established in 2007
2007 establishments in Nigeria